Edmond Julien Decarie (August 8, 1883 – February 1, 1942) was a Canadian professional ice hockey player. He played with the Montreal Canadiens of the National Hockey Association.

References

External links
Ed Decairie at JustSportsStats

1883 births
1942 deaths
Calumet Miners players
Canadian ice hockey centres
Ice hockey people from Ontario
Montreal Canadiens (NHA) players
People from Hawkesbury, Ontario
Sault Ste. Marie Marlboros players